Aureoverticillactam is an antifungal macrocyclic lactam with the molecular formula C28H39NO4 which is produced by the marine bacterium Streptomyces aureoverticillatus. Aureoverticillactam has also cytotoxic activity.

References

Further reading 

 
 

Aureoverticillactam
Macrocycles
Lactams
Polyenes
Triols